William Cecil "Cece" Foderingham (August 12, 1919 – January 29, 1983) was a Canadian football player who played for the Toronto RCAF Hurricanes and the Toronto Argonauts. He won the Grey Cup with both teams, first in 1942 and again in 1947.

References

Canadian football people from Toronto
Toronto Argonauts players
1919 births
1983 deaths
Players of Canadian football from Ontario